The European Communities (Greek Accession) Act 1979 (c. 50) is an Act of the Parliament of the United Kingdom which ratified and legislated for the accession of Greece to the European Communities. It received royal assent on 20 December 1979.

References

See also
Treaty of Accession 1979
List of Acts of the Parliament of the United Kingdom relating to the European Communities / European Union

United Kingdom Acts of Parliament 1979
Acts of the Parliament of the United Kingdom relating to the European Union